is a Japanese actor and voice actor who is represented by 81 Produce. Ogawa was born in Osaka Prefecture, Japan, but was raised in Kashihara, Nara.

Filmography

Drama

Movies

Animation

Video games

Dubbing

Live Action
Boyd Holbrook
Narcos (2015), Steve Murphy
Logan (2017), Donald Pierce
The Predator (2018), Quinn McKenna
Power Rangers Lost Galaxy (1999), Leo Corbett / the Red Galaxy Ranger
Zombieland (2009), Columbus (Jesse Eisenberg)
Super (2011), Frank Darbo / The Crimson Bolt (Rainn Wilson)
Run All Night (2015), Mike Conlon (Joel Kinnaman)
Zombieland: Double Tap (2019), Flagstaff (Thomas Middleditch)

Animation
Mighty Ducks: The Animated Series (1996), Wildwing Flashblade (Ian Ziering) (2007 WOWOW Dub)
Monsters Vs. Aliens (2009), Derek Dietl (Paul Rudd)
Lego Star Wars: Summer Vacation (2022), Vic Vankoh ("Weird Al" Yankovic)

References

External links
  
 Official agency profile 

1968 births
Living people
Japanese male film actors
Japanese male television actors
Japanese male voice actors
Male motion capture actors
Male voice actors from Nara Prefecture
Male voice actors from Osaka Prefecture
People from Kashihara, Nara
81 Produce voice actors